A logging camp (or lumber camp) is a transitory work site used in the logging industry. Before the second half of the 20th century, these camps were the primary place where lumberjacks would live and work to fell trees in a particular area. Many place names (e.g. Bockman Lumber Camp, Whitestone Logging Camp, Camp Douglas) are legacies of old logging camps. Camps were often placed next to river tributaries so that the winter's log harvest could be floated to the lumbermills in the spring.

Design
The requirements of the logging industry involved the creation of a working site and housing from the pristine wilderness. The construction of the logging camp consisted of a transformation of the natural environment to the built environment. Logging was seasonal in nature, with farmers often working as lumberjacks during the winter. Camps were placed next to a river so that the logs harvested could be floated to the lumbermills in the spring. By their nature logging camps were temporary work sites used to harvest lumber in remote areas. Once the lumber in a particular area was harvested, the lumberjacks would move on.  

Primitive sites had two buildings, a cookhouse and a bunkhouse. Larger camps also had an outhouse, barn, blacksmith shop, filer shack (to sharpen the saws), office and camp store. Lumber cut by the lumberjacks was the source of the materials for the buildings, and camps were built in the fall prior to the winter logging season. Most of the lumberjacks would return to their jobs after the logging season, with a few staying on to drive logs in the spring.

In the United States, logging camps were phased out after World War II, as work crews could more easily be transported to remote logging sites.

Camp food

Lumberjacks could work upwards of twelve hours a day, and lumbering was such physically demanding work that each man could eat between 6,000 to 9,000 calories a day. In one estimation, the average logger consumed  of food each day. Quality and quantity were important parts of maintaining the health and productivity of the workers. Meat, other foods high in protein, and fats were served in abundance. Sack lunches were provided to the loggers. During peak season, as many as five meals a day could be served. Camp cooks were important to the morale of the workers. In some cases, workers would follow a cook to the camp they were working at each season.

In Canada, the long distances to the camps and the closure of most access during the winter led to the development of depot farms that would be built near logging camps to supply cereals and vegetables to the loggers as well as food for horses in the form of hay and oats. These farms were often built on poor quality land and had little output other than the camps and self-consumption, and most often closed as soon as the camp did.

See also 
 Holt and Balcom Logging Camp No. 1
 Camp 6 Logging Museum
 Man camp

References

External links

Temporary populated places
Logging communities